Nicolás Czornomaz (born 8 July 1995) is an Argentinian footballer who plays for Ierapetra in Super League Greece 2.

Career
After spending time in his native Argentina with Defensa y Justicia, Czornomaz joined Major League Soccer side Los Angeles FC in April 2018. He was immediately loaned to their United Soccer League affiliate Orange County SC for the remainder of their season.

Personal
Nicolás is the son of former professional footballer Adrián Czornomaz, who played for numerous clubs, including Independiente, Banfield, Defensa y Justicia, SK Rapid Wien, Universitario and Tigres de la UANL.

References

External links
 
 

1995 births
Living people
Association football midfielders
Argentine footballers
USL Championship players
Torneo Argentino A players
Los Angeles FC players
Orange County SC players
Club Atlético Mitre footballers
Defensores de Belgrano de Villa Ramallo players
Argentine expatriate sportspeople in the United States
Argentine expatriate footballers
Expatriate soccer players in the United States
Argentine people of Ukrainian descent
Footballers from Buenos Aires